Nelson Ramodike was a Lebowa government chief minister from 21 October 1987 to 26 April 1994.

Background 
Ramodike is a former traffic police officer turned politician who began his political activism with Lebowa People's Party in the 1980s. He became chief minister after the death of then chief minister of the Lebowa government Cedric Phatudi.

Political affiliation 
Ramodike is referred to as a conformist for disbanding his political party, the Lebowa People's Party, to form the United People's Front in order to pave the way for participation in the Convention for a Democratic South Africa (CODESA). He often addressed traditional leadership about political developments in the Lebowa Bantustans. For example, Ramodike addressed the Hananwa traditional authority at a rally.  Nelson Ramodike was a member of the United Democratic Front, and later joined the African National Congress for a place in the CODESA negotiations before the 1994 South African general elections. Ramodike was also a spokesperson for the United Democratic Movement in 2001. He quit politics due to illness in May 2007.

Corruption allegations 
The De Meyer report presented allegations of corrupt activities in the Lebowa government, with Nelson Ramodike accused of involvement in two illegal liquor licenses. Nelson Ramodike was allegedly involved in corruption activities that involved running state funded business through proxies such as cousins and brothers.

Court cases against government 
During his tenure as chief minister, Ramodike introduced a statute referred to as the Lebowa Mineral Act (LMT). As legislation during the Bantustans period, the LMT sought to place land rights under the former Lebowa administration and mineral rights to the people in the locality. The LMT was later referred to as controversial post 1994, where several debates and discussions took place among members of the Parliament of South Africa. Through these debates and discussions, it was resolved that the LMT should be abolished because it referred to land rights and mineral rights of a state that was no longer in existence in democratic South Africa.  In response to a bill to abolishment of the Lebowa Mineral Act and Trust, Ramodike lodged a court challenge against the government of the African National Congress in the early 2000s. The court case was lost to former President Thabo Mbeki on 7 April 2001.

Death 
Nelson Ramodike died on 3 May 2012 at Tzaneen Mediclinic in Limpopo. Former Limpopo  province premier Cassel Mathale lauded Nelson Ramodike for his role in the liberation struggle of South Africa.

References 

Year of birth missing
2012 deaths
Lebowa
African National Congress politicians